Epideira torquata is a species of sea snail, a marine gastropod mollusk in the family Horaiclavidae.

Description

Distribution
This marine species is endemic to Australia and occurs off Tasmania and Victoria.

References

 Tryon, G.W. 1884. Conidae & Pleurotomidae. Manual of Conchology. Philadelphia : G.W. Tryon Vol. 6. 
 Hedley, C. 1922. A revision of the Australian Turridae. Records of the Australian Museum 13(6): 213–359, pls 42–56
 Powell, A.W.B. 1966. The molluscan families Speightiidae and Turridae, an evaluation of the valid taxa, both Recent and fossil, with list of characteristic species. Bulletin of the Auckland Institute and Museum. Auckland, New Zealand 5: 1–184, pls 1–23
 Wilson, B. 1994. Australian marine shells. Prosobranch gastropods. Kallaroo, WA : Odyssey Publishing Vol. 2 370 pp. [191, pl. 40, figs 35a, b]
 Tucker, J.K. 2004. Catalog of Recent and fossil turrids (Mollusca: Gastropoda). Zootaxa 682: 1–1295

External links
 Grove, S. 2011. Turridae - Crassispirinae: Epidirona torquata. A Guide to the Seashells and other Marine Molluscs of Tasmania website.

torquata
Gastropods described in 1922